The 2013 PBZ Zagreb Indoors was an ATP tennis tournament played on hard courts indoors. It was the 8th edition of the PBZ Zagreb Indoors, and part of the ATP World Tour 250 series of the 2013 ATP World Tour. It took place in Zagreb, Croatia from February 2 through February 10, 2013.

Singles main-draw entrants

Seeds 

 Rankings are as of January 28, 2013.

Other entrants 
The following players received wildcards into the singles main draw:
  Nikola Mektić
  Mate Pavić
  Antonio Veić

The following players received entry from the qualifying draw:
  Michael Berrer
  Ilija Bozoljac
  Philipp Petzschner
  Filip Veger

The following players received entry as lucky losers:
  Dino Marcan
  Matteo Viola

Withdrawals 
Before the tournament
  Evgeny Donskoy
  Łukasz Kubot (ankle injury)
  Gilles Müller
  Björn Phau
  Andreas Seppi (fever)

Retirements
  Michael Berrer (fatigue)
  Lukáš Lacko (lower back injury)

Doubles main-draw entrants

Seeds 

 Rankings are as of January 28, 2013.

Other entrants 
The following pairs received wildcards into the doubles main draw:
  Toni Androić /  Dino Marcan
  Mate Delić /  Franko Škugor

Withdrawals 
Before the tournament
  Evgeny Donskoy
  Lukáš Lacko (lower back injury)
  Björn Phau
  Andreas Seppi (fever)
During the tournament
  Marcos Baghdatis (foot injury)

Champions

Singles 

 Marin Čilić def.  Jürgen Melzer, 6–3, 6–1

Doubles 

 Julian Knowle /  Filip Polášek def.  Ivan Dodig /  Mate Pavić, 6–3, 6–3

References

External links 
 

Zagreb Indoors
PBZ Zagreb Indoors
2013 in Croatian tennis